Final Battle 2007 was the 6th Final Battle major professional wrestling event produced by Ring of Honor (ROH). It took place on December 30, 2007 from the Manhattan Center in New York City.

It was the fifth annual event in the Final Battle chronology, with the first taking place in 2002.

Background 
Final Battle featured nine professional wrestling matches that involved different wrestlers from pre-existing scripted feuds and storylines. Wrestlers were portrayed as either villains or heroes in the scripted events that built tension and culminated in a wrestling match.

One of the show’s two main events was to feature Nigel McGuinness defending the ROH World Championship in a Four Way Fray against Bryan Danielson, Chris Hero and Takeshi Morishima. However, the night before McGuinness was severely injured in his defense against Austin Aries. During the match, Aries dove from the ring, smashing Nigel's face on the edge of the guard rail, resulting in a concussion, a broken nose and a gash about his eye that need 15 stitches. As a result, Aries was added to the Four Way Fray, with the winner getting a shot at the ROH World Championship at the Sixth Anniversary Show.

Results

See also
List of Ring of Honor pay-per-view events

References

External links 
 Ring of Honor's official website

2007 in professional wrestling
2007 in New York City
Events in New York City
2007
Professional wrestling in New York City
December 2007 events in the United States